Selma is the eponymous eighth studio album by Bosnian pop-folk singer Selma Bajrami. It was released 23 July 2014 through Hayat Production in Bosnia and Herzegovina and City Records in Serbia.

Singles
A 20-second preview of the lead single "James Dean" (named after the American actor) was released on SoundCloud on 30 November 2012, while full song was released on YouTube on 14 December 2012. The song was originally titled "Djevojke" ("Girls").

The second single "Nisam ti oprostila" ("I Haven't Forgiven You") and its music video premiered 19 December 2013. Less than two weeks later, Bajrami sang the ballad, "Moje milo" ("My Dear") at a New Year's Eve television special. It served as the album's third single and is about her son, who was 17 months old at the time.

On 4 June 2014, "Tijelo bez duše" ("Body Without a Soul"), the album's upbeat pop fourth single, co-produced by Atelje Trag, had its premiere when the music video was released. The video was filmed in March 2014.

Track listing

Personnel

Instruments

Mensura Bajraktarević – backing vocals
Suzana Dinić – backing vocals
Vernesa Deljkić – backing vocals
Vernes Ljuštaku – backing vocals, bass guitar
Petar Trumbetaš – guitar
Dejan Abadić – keyboards
Samir Selmanović – keyboards, accordion

Production and recording

Dejan Abadić – arrangement (3, 8), mastering (2, 3, 4, 5, 6, 7, 8, 9)
Vernes Ljuštaku – arrangement (2, 4, 5, 6, 7, 9)
Vuk Zirojević – mastering (2, 3, 4, 5, 6, 7, 8, 9), mixing (3, 8), recording
Samir Selmanović – mixing (2, 4, 5, 6, 7, 9)
Đorđe Petrović – programming
Amil Lojo – recording
Marin Meštrović – recording

Crew

Stevan Miljković – design
Dejan Milićević – music video director

References

2014 albums
Selma Bajrami albums
Hayat Production albums